Dan Hotels is an Israeli hotel chain established in 1947. The chain owns 18 hotels in Israel with 3,669 rooms, a convention center and a hotel training center, as well as a 226-room hotel in Bangalore, India.

History

In June 1947, Yekutiel and Shmuel Federmann leased Kaete Dan, a small guest house on Tel Aviv beach from its then-owner, Abraham Stamberg. They built the Dan hotel around the original pension, finally purchasing the Kaete Dan in 1956. Adopting the name from the previous owner, they formed the Dan Hotels Corporation. The Dan Tel Aviv in 1953 was the city's first luxury hotel.

In 1957, the Federmanns purchased the King David Hotel in Jerusalem. In 1958, they purchased the beach front Dan Accadia in Herzliya, followed in 1960 by the Dan Carmel in Haifa and Dan Caesarea in 1971. In June 1982 its shares were listed for trading on the Tel Aviv Stock Exchange.

Despite economic problems in the 1980s, the chain opened the Dan Panorama in Tel Aviv and Dan Panorama in Haifa. In 1995, it opened the Dan Eilat, followed by the Dan Panorama Jerusalem, Dan Gardens Ashkelon and Dan Panorama Eilat. In 2000, the chain renovated and refurbished the Dvir Hotel in Haifa, renaming it the Dan Gardens Haifa. The Dan Gourmet School for chefs is on the grounds of this property. In 2007, it bought the Ariel Hotel in Jerusalem, which was renovated and reopened as the Dan Boutique.  The Hyatt-Regency on Mount Scopus was acquired and renamed the Dan Jerusalem.

In 2017, Dan Hotels opened its first overseas property at Bangalore, India. The 226 room hotel is named 'The Den' and is located in the Whitefield district of the city. In June 2018, it opened the Link & Hub hotel in Tel Aviv. In December 2018, Dan hotels was in talk to purchase the hotel properties of the Israel Land Development Company which owns the Rimonim hotel chain.

Activities

Dan Hotels owns commercial property and apartments at King David Towers in Tel Aviv and has one-third ownership in the commercial and management center of the Panorama Shopping Mall in Haifa. 

Hotels
Jerusalem: 
King David (237 rooms), 
Dan Panorama, Jerusalem (292 rooms),
Dan Jerusalem (505 rooms) and 
Dan Boutique, Jerusalem (129 rooms).
Tel Aviv:
Dan Tel Aviv (280 rooms), 
Dan Panorama, Tel Aviv (492 rooms),
Link Tel Aviv Hub & Hotel (93 rooms).
Herzliya: Dan Accadia (209 rooms).
Caesarea: Dan Caesarea (116 rooms).
Haifa: Dan Carmel (227 rooms), 
Dan Panorama Haifa (266 rooms), 
Mirabelle Plaza Haifa (100 rooms).
Eilat: Dan Eilat (378 rooms), 
Dan Panorama Eilat (277 rooms), 
Neptune Eilat (280 rooms).
North: 
Ruth Zefat (77 rooms), 
Marys Well Nazareth (266 rooms).
Bangalore, India: The Den (226 rooms).

Awards and recognition
2018: The Link Hotel & Hub was ranked in Fodor's 100 most incredible hotels in the world.

See also
Tourism in Israel
Economy of Israel

References

External links 

Hotels in Israel
Israeli brands
Hotels established in 1947
1947 establishments in Mandatory Palestine
Hospitality companies of Israel